Bargasa was an inland town in the north of ancient Caria, inhabited during Hellenistic and Roman times. 

Its site is located near Haydere/Kavaklı in Asiatic Turkey.

References

Populated places in ancient Caria
Former populated places in Turkey
Roman towns and cities in Turkey
History of Aydın Province